Rogatien-Joseph Martin (March 15, 1849-May 27, 1912) was a French clergyman and bishop for the Roman Catholic Diocese of Taiohae. He was appointed bishop in 1892. He died in 1912.

References 

1849 births
1912 deaths
French Roman Catholic bishops
Roman Catholic bishops of Taiohae